Baptistin Baille was born as Jean-Baptiste Baille in France, in 1841 and he died in 1918. He was a professor of optics and acoustics at the École de Physique et de Chimie Industrielles in Paris and a close friend of Paul Cézanne, the impressionist artist, and of Émile Zola who would later become a writer.

"Les trois inséparables"
Together, they were known as "les trois inséparables" (the three inseparables). The three boys met when they were at school and often swam together at the River Arc. Cézanne produced numerous paintings of male bathers based on these experiences, which Zola also remembered in his novel, L'Œuvre, 

Another friend and classmate was Louis Marguery, future lawyer and writer for vaudeville.

References

Sources
Brown, F. 1984. Zola and Cézanne: The early years. New Criterion 3:15–29.

19th-century French scientists
1841 births
1918 deaths
French academics